Elathur Railway Station  is a railway station serving the city of Kozhikode in the Kozhikode District of Kerala. It lies in the Shoranur–Mangalore section of the Southern Railways.  Trains halting at the station connect the town to prominent cities in India such as  Kozhikode, Coimbatore and Kannur.

References

Railway stations in Kozhikode district
Palakkad railway division